, formerly known as Necromachina, is a side-scrolling platforming video game developed by feelplus and published by Square Enix. It was released for the PlayStation Network in March 2011, and for the Xbox Live Arcade on May 4, 2011.

Plot

It is the dawn of the 22nd century on the third planet from the sun. Humanity, broken free from its eschatological thralls, now watches as a lone boy stands before it. Within his hands, he controls the power of Mephistopheles – a force which can breathe life into that which has none. Animated machines devour the helpless; buildings shower the streets with storms of glass; cups, trains, bridges, whole towns – the remnants of civilization are transformed into bloodthirsty beasts whose only purpose is to wield the hammer of judgment.

The boy's name is Faust, and he will not stop until he has cleansed the planet of humankind and claimed it as his own. Centuries have passed since his advent, and the world now holds its breath as the End of Days draws ever closer. Yet hope is not lost. Hidden among humanity's last remaining survivors, an elite unit of specially trained ninja known as Moondivers have been lying in wait for orders from their Shogun to embark on one final mission to reclaim the planet. Today, those orders arrived.

Development
Koichi Yotsui directed the four-player side-scroller, with gameplay reminiscent of the Strider game series, which was also helmed by Yotsui.

Reception

The game received "mixed" reviews on both platforms according to the review aggregation website Metacritic. IGN called it fun but inconsistent and flawed. Official Xbox Magazine praised the co-op mode but criticized the unnecessary long stages and called the solo mode a hopeless grind. Game Informer said that the multiplayer component was more enjoyable and polished than the single player.

References

External links
 

2011 video games
Cooperative video games
Feelplus games
Hack and slash games
Video games about ninja
Platform games
PlayStation 3 games
PlayStation Network games
Side-scrolling role-playing video games
Side-scrolling video games
Square Enix games
Video games developed in Japan
Video games featuring female protagonists
Video games set in Spain
Video games set in the 22nd century
Video games set in the United States
Video games with 2.5D graphics
Xbox 360 games
Xbox 360 Live Arcade games